Elections were held in Renfrew County, Ontario on October 25, 2010 in conjunction with municipal elections across the province.

Renfrew County Council
County council has no direct elections; its membership is made up of the mayors and reeves of the lower-tier municipalities of the county, including the reeves (not the mayors) or Arnprior, Renfrew and Whitewater Region. Therefore, elections in those municipalities determine the members of council for the new term.

Admaston Bromley

Arnprior

Bonnechere Valley

Brudenell, Lyndoch and Raglan

Deep River

Greater Madawaska

Head, Clara and Maria

Horton

Killaloe, Hagarty and Richards

Laurentian Hills

Laurentian Valley

Madawaska Valley

McNab/Braeside

North Algona-Wilberforce

Petawawa
In Petawawa, voters elected six at-large councillors by casting their paper ballots in 19 polls at the Petawawa Civic Centre.

Renfrew

Whitewater Region

References

2010 Ontario municipal elections
Politics of Renfrew County